Mullins may refer to:
 Mullins, South Carolina, a US city
 Mullins (surname), people with the surname Mullins 
 AMD Mullins, a series of Accelerated Processing Units (APUs) by AMD

See also
 Mullins River
 Mullins Center, Amherst, an arena
 Mullins effect, a feature of rubber's mechanical behavior
 Mullens (disambiguation)